Bagre Dam is a multipurpose dam on the White Volta located near Bagré Village in Burkina Faso.

History
The Dam constructed in 1992 at a cost of 67 million CFA from the World Bank.

References

Embankment dams
Dams in Burkina Faso
Hydroelectric power stations in Burkina Faso
Ramsar sites in Burkina Faso
Dams completed in 1992
Energy infrastructure completed in 1992